The Seeweiher is a reservoir north of the village  of Waldernbach in the municipality of Mengerskirchen (county of Limburg-Weilburg) in the Westerwald in the German state of Hesse. It impounds the  Vöhlerbach, a tributary of the Kallenbach which, in turn, flows into the River Lahn. It has a surface area of 13 hectares.

The Seeweiher was impounded in 1452 and is thus one of the oldest reservoirs in Hesse.

Leisure facilities 
There was a campsite on the shores of the bathing lake and, since 1978, there has been a weekend village with 66 houses. 
Once a year the Westerwald Water Working Group holds a water work assessment for Newfoundland and Landseer dogs on land owned by the DLRG by the Seeweiher.

References

External links 
 Hessian State Officwe for the Environment and Geology: Seeweiher Mengerskirchen. In: Badeseen in Hessen, retrieved 13 May 2009
 Information on the Seeweiher
 Information on the Westerwald Water Working Group

Reservoirs in Hesse
Lakes of the Westerwald
Limburg-Weilburg
RSeeweiher
Ponds of Germany